Purkot  is a village development committee in Tanahu District in the Gandaki Zone of central Nepal. At the time of the 2011 Nepal census it had a population of 7,188 people, 3,044 male and 4,144 female. This VDC is located on the highway called Chame highway (Dumre-Besishahar) and has a small town called Baisjanger. The  Marshyandi river flows through this place.

There is few holy places like Marshyangdi beni ghat sataal and the Temples of Five Hindu gods (Pancha Mandir) of Shiva, Bishnu, Krishna, Surya and Krishna, located beside the Marsyangdi River at Baisjangar Tanahun.

References

External links
UN map of the municipalities of Tanahu District
A local News Agency of Purkot

Populated places in Tanahun District